Maha Bandula (also spelled Mahabandoola) is a 19th-century Burmese general who fought against the British in the First Anglo-Burmese War of 1824–1826.

Many places and structures are named in his honor:
 Maha Bandula Bridge:  A major bridge in eastern Yangon linking Pazundaung Township and Dawbon Township
 Maha Bandula Park:  A famous park in downtown Yangon; Independence Monument is located here
 Maha Bandula Road:  One of four main east–west thoroughfares in downtown Yangon